The 1977 Ontario general election was held on June 9, 1977, to elect the 125 members of the 31st Legislative Assembly of Ontario.

The Progressive Conservative Party, led by Premier Bill Davis, was re-elected for an eleventh consecutive term in office, again with a minority in the legislature. The PCs won an additional seven seats, but were not able to win a majority. The Liberal Party, led by Dr. Stuart Smith, lost one seat compared to its result in the previous election, but formed the Official Opposition because the NDP lost more seats. The New Democratic Party, led by Stephen Lewis, lost five seats, and losing the status of Official Opposition to the Liberals.

Sheila Copps, future federal cabinet minister and Deputy Prime Minister of Canada, made her political debut in this election, finishing second in the riding of Hamilton Centre. This was the first election in which Jim Bradley, the second-longest serving MPP in Ontario history, was elected.

Results

1 Includes T. Patrick Reid, a Liberal MPP who is re-elected in 1977 as a Liberal-Labour candidate (he had previously been elected as Liberal-Labour in 1967 but was re-elected in 1971 and 1975 as a straight Liberal).

A number of unregistered parties also contested this election. The North American Labour Party, consisting of Lyndon LaRouche supporters, ran three candidates in Toronto and three elsewhere in the province.  The Revolutionary Marxist Group and League for Socialist Action fielded one candidate apiece; soon after the election, both groups merged into the Revolutionary Workers League.

Some members of the Social Credit Party also ran in the election, although it is not clear if they were formally endorsed by the party.

Riding results

|-
| style="background:whitesmoke;"|Algoma   
| 
|Dave Liddle5,751 (40.49%)
|
|Gabriel Tremblay1,534 (10.80%)
||
|Bud Wildman6,917 (48.70%)
|
|
||
|Bud Wildman
|-
| style="background:whitesmoke;"|Algoma—Manitoulin 
||
|John Lane7,381 (56.64%)
|
|Don Prescott3,486 (26.75%)
|
|Tasso Christie2,165 (16.61%)
|
|
||
|John Lane
|-
| style="background:whitesmoke;"|Armourdale
||
|Bruce McCaffrey14,082 (42.67%)
|
|Des Newman11,649 (35.29%)
|
|Marlene Koehler6,736 (20.41%)
|
|Bruce Evoy (Lbt)280 (0.85%)David Wraggett (Ind)258 (0.78%)
||
|Philip Givens
|-
| style="background:whitesmoke;"|Beaches—Woodbine
|
|Tom Wardle9,217 (37.31%)
|
|Ernest Barr3,579 (14.49%)
||
|Marion Bryden11,491 (46.51%)
|
|George Leslie (Ind)203 (0.81%)Gerry Van Houten (Comm)114 (0.46%)Shirley Yamada (Lbt)103 (0.41%)
||
|Marion Bryden
|-
| style="background:whitesmoke;"|Bellwoods
|
|Maria Sgro2,925 (22.62%)
|
|Millie Caccia3,332 (25.77%)
||
|Ross McClellan6,177 (47.76%)
|
|Scarth Heap (Comm)194 (1.50%)Grace-Ann Paulson (Lbt)152 (1.17%)Ronald Rodgers (Ind)151 (1.17%)
||
|Ross McClellan
|-
| style="background:whitesmoke;"|Brampton
||
|Bill Davis19,641 (51.92%)
|
|Bob Callahan7,948 (21.01%)
|
|John Deamer9,897 (26.16%)
|
|John MacLennan (Comm)216 (0.57%)Therese Faubert (LSA)86 (0.23%)Fred Haight (NALP)44 (0.12%)
||
|Bill Davis
|-
| style="background:whitesmoke;"|Brantford
|
|Phil Gillies9,081 (31.77%)
|
|Arne Zabell6,130 (21.44%)
||
|Mac Makarchuk13,376 (46.79%)
|
|
||
|Mac Makarchuk
|-
| style="background:whitesmoke;"|Brant—Oxford—Haldimand
|
|Clare Huffman5,812 (23.41%)
||
|Robert Nixon14,256 (57.42%)
|
|Jim Schneider4,760 (19.17%)
|
|
||
|Robert Nixon
|-
| style="background:whitesmoke;"|Brock
||
|Bob Welch11,944 (51.77%)
|
|Marv Edwards5,910 (25.62%)
|
|Robert Hoover5,215 (22.61%)
|
|
||
|Bob Welch
|-
| style="background:whitesmoke;"|Burlington South
||
|George Kerr18,892 (51.06%)
|
|John O'Boyle10,474 (28.31%)
|
|Bill Brown7,015 (18.96%)
|
|John Lawson (Lbt)615 (1.66%)
||
|George Kerr
|-
| style="background:whitesmoke;"|Cambridge
|
|Bill Barlow10,566 (35.45%)
|
|Claudette Millar7,870 (26.40%)
||
|Monty Davidson11,120 (37.31%)
|
|John Long (Ind SC)252 (0.85%)
||
|Monty Davidson
|-
| style="background:whitesmoke;"|Carleton
||
|Sid Handleman14,847 (46.51%)
|
|Eileen Consiglio10,241 (32.08%)
|
|Judy Wasylycia-Leis6,837 (21.41%)
|
|
||
|Sid Handleman
|-
| style="background:whitesmoke;"|Carleton East
|
|Darwin Kealey12,052 (32.91%)
|
|Ed Ryan11,837 (32.32%)
||
|Evelyn Gigantes12,733 (34.77%)
|
|
||
|Evelyn Gigantes
|-
| style="background:whitesmoke;"|Carleton-Grenville
||
|Norm Sterling14,002 (59.61%)
|
|Paul Raina5,493 (23.38%)
|
|Jack McLachlen3,995 (17.01%)
|
|
||
|Donald Irvine
|-
| style="background:whitesmoke;"|Chatham—Kent
||
|Darcy McKeough10,769 (46.48%)
|
|Darrell Gall5,919 (25.55%)
|
|Ron Franko6,482 (27.96%)
|
|
||
|Darcy McKeough
|-
| style="background:whitesmoke;"|Cochrane North
||
|René Brunelle10,412 (61.44%)
|
|Frank Levay2,488 (14.68%)
|
|Robert Fortin4,047 (23.88%)
|
|
||
|René Brunelle
|-
| style="background:whitesmoke;"|Cochrane South
||
|Alan Pope12,533 (51.26%)
|
|Kenneth Matthews1,442 (5.90%)
|
|Bill Ferrier10,256 (41.95%)
|
|Clem Larochelle (Ind)219 (0.89%)
||
|Bill Ferrier
|-
| style="background:whitesmoke;"|Cornwall
|
|James Kirkey9,492 (43.84%)
|
|Allan Burn2,089 (9.65%)
||
|George Samis9,978 (46.08%)
|
|James Rideout (Ind)94 (0.43%)
||
|George Samis
|-
| style="background:whitesmoke;"|Don Mills
||
|Dennis Timbrell17,005 (55.20%)
|
|Andrew Meles4,906 (15.92%)
|
|Steve Thomas8,125 (26.37%)
|
|Michael Martin (Lbt)772 (2.51%)
||
|Dennis Timbrell
|-
| style="background:whitesmoke;"|Dovercourt
|
|George Nixon4,183 (27.52%)
|
|A. David MacDonald3,162 (20.81%)
||
|Tony Lupusella7,340 (48.30%)
|
|William Stewart (Comm)380 (2.50%)Maureen Cain (Lbt)133 (0.87%)
||
|Tony Lupusella
|-
| style="background:whitesmoke;"|Downsview
|
|Sam Stabile6,152 (27.22%)
|
|Joe DeAngelis5,814 (25.72%)
||
|Odoardo Di Santo10,194 (45.10%)
|
|Michael Little (Lbt)251 (1.11%)Doreen Leitch (NALP)193 (0.85%)
||
|Odoardo Di Santo
|-
| style="background:whitesmoke;"|Dufferin—Simcoe
||
|George McCague15,528 (48.81%)
|
|James Wales9,480 (29.80%)
|
|Bill Fox6,369 (20.02%)
|
|Reg Gervais (SC)438 (1.38%)
||
|George McCague
|-
| style="background:whitesmoke;"|Durham East
||
|Sam Cureatz12,862 (41.66%)
|
|Joan Downey5,121 (16.58%)
|
|Doug Moffatt12,740 (41.26%)
|
|Lloyd Leitch (NALP)153 (0.50%)
||
|Doug Moffatt
|-
| style="background:whitesmoke;"|Durham West
||
|George Ashe12,688 (41.30%)
|
|Joe Bugelli5,075 (16.52%)
|
|Charles Godfrey12,095 (39.37%)
|
|Bill Leslie (Ind)865 (2.81%)
||
|Charles Godfrey
|-
| style="background:whitesmoke;"|Durham—York
||
|Bill Newman14,134 (51.44%)
|
|Liz Catty6,345 (23.09%)
|
|Allan McPhail7,000 (25.47%)
|
|
||
|Bill Newman
|-
| style="background:whitesmoke;"|Eglinton
||
|Roy McMurtry19,213 (59.60%)
|
|Sean McCann7,471 (23.17%)
|
|Eileen Elmy4,857 (15.07%)
|
|Linda Cain (Lbt)382 (1.18%)John Stifel (Ind)315 (0.98%)
||
|Roy McMurtry
|-
| style="background:whitesmoke;"|Elgin
||
|Ron McNeil12,655 (47.48%)
|
|Dave Cook9,174 (34.42%)
|
|Colin Swan4,654 (17.46%)
|
|William Triska (Ind)172 (0.64%)
||
|Ron McNeil
|-
| style="background:whitesmoke;"|Erie
|
|Greg Parker5,833 (58.39%)
||
|Ray Haggerty10,008 (48.71%)
|
|Barrie MacLeod4,704 (22.90%)
|
|
||
|Ray Haggerty
|-
| style="background:whitesmoke;"|Essex North
|
|Marcel Desjardins4,383 (22.89%)
||
|Dick Ruston9,801 (51.19%)
|
|Dave Bradley4,964 (25.92%)
|
|
||
|Dick Ruston
|-
| style="background:whitesmoke;"|Essex South
|
|Frank Klees7,991 (32.56%)
||
|Remo Mancini11,215 (45.69%)
|
|Dan Lauzon5,340 (21.75%)
|
|
||
|Remo Mancini
|-
| style="background:whitesmoke;"|Etobicoke
|
|Rosalyn McKenna6,789 (26.83%)
|
|Ben Bellantone6,363 (25.14%)
||
|Ed Philip11,637 (45.99%)
|
|Richard Bostler (Lbt)517 (2.04%)
||
|Ed Philip
|-
| style="background:whitesmoke;"|Fort William
||
|Mickey Hennessy12,230 (46.28%)
|
|Dick O'Donnell4,080 (15.44%)
|
|Iain Angus9,974 (37.74%)
|
|Clifford Wahl (Comm)142 (0.54%)
||
|Iain Angus
|-
| style="background:whitesmoke;"|Frontenac—Addington
|
|Winston Cousins9,777 (40.82%)
||
|J. Earl McEwen10,582 (44.18%)
|
|Bill Barnes3,280 (13.69%)
|
|Ross Baker (Ind)315 (1.32%)
||
|J. Earl McEwen
|-
| style="background:whitesmoke;"|Grey
|
|Fred Taylor7,589 (28.69%)
||
|Bob McKessock14,651 (55.39%)
|
|Walter Miller4,210 (15.92%)
|
|
||
|Bob McKessock
|-
| style="background:whitesmoke;"|Grey-Bruce
|
|Harvey Davis9,425 (35.26%)
||
|Eddie Sargent14,828 (55.47%)
|
|Bill Proud2,477 (9.27%)
|
|
||
|Eddie Sargent
|-
| style="background:whitesmoke;"|Haldimand-Norfolk
|
|Gordon McNern11,632 (37.06%)
||
|Gordon Miller15,496 (49.37%)
|
|Norm Walpole4,257 (13.56%)
|
|
||
|Gordon Miller
|-
| style="background:whitesmoke;"|Halton—Burlington
|
|George Gray10,287 (34.44%)
||
|Julian Reed13,985 (46.82%)
|
|Bill Johnson5,598 (18.74%)
|
|
||
|Julian Reed
|-
| style="background:whitesmoke;"|Hamilton Centre
|
|Bill McCulloch5,092 (23.47%)
|
|Sheila Copps Miller8,202 (37.80%)
||
|Mike Davison8,216 (37.86%)
|
|Art Walling (Comm)189 (0.87%)
||
|Mike Davison
|-
| style="background:whitesmoke;"|Hamilton East
|
|Fred Campbell6,605 (21.51%)
|
|Olga Varga9,266 (30.17%)
||
|Robert W. Mackenzie14,461 (47.09%)
|
|Bob Jaggard (Comm)376 (1.22%)
||
|Robert W. Mackenzie
|-
| style="background:whitesmoke;"|Hamilton Mountain
|
|John Smith12,308 (37.13%)
|
|Kris Channan7,910 (23.86%)
||
|Brian Charlton12,681 (38.26%)
|
|Mike Mirza (Comm)247 (0.75%)
||
|John Smith
|-
| style="background:whitesmoke;"|Hamilton West
|
|Maurice Carter8,379 (29.47%)
||
|Stuart Smith12,239 (43.05%)
|
|Marjorie Baskin7,668 (26.97%)
|
|Lucylle Boikoff (NALP)144 (0.51%)
||
|Stuart Smith
|-
| style="background:whitesmoke;"|Hastings-Peterborough
||
|Clarke Rollins11,442 (47.22%)
|
|Dave Hobson9,584 (39.55%)
|
|Elmer Buchanan2,808 (11.59%)
|
|Bill Hawthorne Jr.247 (1.02%)Gary Beamish149 (0.61%)
||
|Clarke Rollins
|-
| style="background:whitesmoke;"|High Park—Swansea
|
|Bill Boytchuk9,630 (37.80%)
|
|Ted Ives4,897 (19.22%)
||
|Ed Ziemba10,409 (40.86%)
|
|Robert McKay (Lbt)360 (1.41%)Christian Negre  (Comm)177 (0.69%)
||
|Ed Ziemba
|-
| style="background:whitesmoke;"|Humber
||
|John MacBeth19,888 (50.95%)
|
|John Dods10,572 (27.08%)
|
|Bob Curran7,781 (19.93%)
|
|Sheldon Gold (Lbt)399 (1.02%)Kris Hansen394 (1.01%) 
||
|John MacBeth
|-
| style="background:whitesmoke;"|Huron-Bruce
|
|Sam MacGregor7,523 (28.25%)
||
|Murray Gaunt17,356 (65.17%)
|
|David Zyluk1,754 (6.59%)
|
|
||
|Murray Gaunt
|-
| style="background:whitesmoke;"|Huron—Middlesex
|
|Anson McKinley8,878 (38.55%)
||
|Jack Riddell12,749 (55.35%)
|
|Shirley Weary1,405 (6.10%)
|
|
||
|Jack Riddell
|-
| style="background:whitesmoke;"|Kenora
||
|Leo Bernier10,882 (57.14%)
|
|Rupert Ross (Liberal-Labour)2,907 (15.26%)
|
|Bill Watkins5,256 (27.60%)
|
|
||
|Leo Bernier
|-
| style="background:whitesmoke;"|Kent—Elgin
|
|Don Luckham9,397 (42.80%)
||
|Jim McGuigan10,038 (45.72%)
|
|Ed Cutler2,521 (11.48%)
|
|
||
|Jack Spence
|-
| style="background:whitesmoke;"|Kingston and the Islands
||
|Keith Norton12,246 (52.32%)
|
|Peter Watson6,490 (27.73%)
|
|John Clements4,510 (19.27%)
|
|Louise Andrews (Comm)158 (0.68%)
||
|Keith Norton
|-
| style="background:whitesmoke;"|Kitchener
|
|Sid McLennan6,910 (24.94%)
||
|Jim Breithaupt14,425 (52.06%)
|
|Cam Conrad6,264 (22.61%)
|
|Evelina Pan (Comm)111 (0.40%)
||
|Jim Breithaupt
|-
| style="background:whitesmoke;"|Kitchener-Wilmot
|
|Curtis Roth6,470 (26.54%)
||
|John Sweeney 12,450 (51.07%)
|
|Jo Surich5,456 (22.38%)
|
|
||
|John Sweeney
|-
| style="background:whitesmoke;"|Lake Nipigon
|
|Al Charr2,417 (20.91%)
|
|John Lentowicz Miller1,397 (12.08%)
||
|Jack Stokes7,747 (67.01%)
|
|
||
|Jack Stokes
|-
| style="background:whitesmoke;"|Lambton
||
|Lorne Henderson11,604 (52.63%)
|
|Fred McCormick8,741 (39.65%)
|
|Cliff Swanstrom1,702 (7.72%)
|
|
||
|Lorne Henderson
|-
| style="background:whitesmoke;"|Lanark
||
|Douglas Wiseman11,086 (55.42%)
|
|Craig Steenburgh3,919 (19.59%)
|
|Bev Greenslade4,997 (24.98%)
|
|
||
|Douglas Wiseman
|-
| style="background:whitesmoke;"|Lakeshore
|
|Al Kolyn6,683 (26.12%)
|
|Carl Weinsheimer4,815 (18.82%)
||
|Pat Lawlor13,345 (52.16%)
|
|Gordon Flowers (Comm)740 (2.89%)
||
|Pat Lawlor
|-
| style="background:whitesmoke;"|Leeds
||
|James Auld14,853 (67.65%)
|
|John Carley3,702 (16.86%)
|
|Jim Morrison3,400 (15.49%)
|
|
||
|James Auld
|-
| style="background:whitesmoke;"|Lincoln
|
|Ron Southward9,387 (42.36%)
||
|Ross Hall9,969 (44.98%)
|
|Barbara Mersereau2,806 (12.66%)
|
|
||
|Ross Hall
|-
| style="background:whitesmoke;"|London Centre
|
|Frank Ross8,915 (31.61%)
||
|David Peterson12,808 (45.42%)
|
|Stu Ross6,279 (22.26%)
|
|Agnes Shaw (Ind)200 (0.71%)
||
|David Peterson
|-
| style="background:whitesmoke;"|London North
|
|Marvin Shore10,631 (33.23%)
||
|Ron Van Horne15,033 (46.99%)
|
|David Cunningham6,130 (19.16%)
|
|Greg Utas (Lbt)201 (0.63%)
||
|Marvin Shore
|-
| style="background:whitesmoke;"|London South
||
|Gordon Walker16,011 (42.38%)
|
|John Ferris13,800 (36.53%)
|
|Tom Olien7,964 (21.08%)
|
|
||
|John Ferris
|-
| style="background:whitesmoke;"|Middlesex
||
|Robert G. Eaton10,247 (42.46%)
|
|Don Nisbet8,889 (36.83%)
|
|Gordon Hill4,998 (20.71%)
|
|
||
|Robert G Eaton
|-
| style="background:whitesmoke;"|Mississauga East
||
|Bud Gregory11,945 (45.25%)
|
|Irene Robinson8,456 (32.04%)
|
|Neil Davis5,994 (22.71%)
|
|
||
|Bud Gregory
|-
| style="background:whitesmoke;"|Mississauga North
||
|Terry Jones16,151 (46.56%)
|
|Al LaRochelle5,684 (16.39%)
|
|David Busby12,401 (35.75%)
|
|Betty Cerar (Lbt)380 (1.10%)Anna Sideris (Comm)71 (0.20%)
||
|Terry Jones
|-
| style="background:whitesmoke;"|Mississauga South
||
|Douglas Kennedy13,622 (47.91%)
|
|Mike Garvey7,616 (26.78%)
|
|Ted Humphreys7,196 (25.31%)
|
|
||
|Douglas Kennedy
|-
| style="background:whitesmoke;"|Muskoka
||
|Frank Miller8,865 (49.23%)
|
|Peggy Fitzpatrick2,774 (15.41%)
|
|Ken Cargill6,368 (35.36%)
|
|
||
|Frank Miller
|-
| style="background:whitesmoke;"|Niagara Falls
|
|Guy Ungaro9,352 (30.58%)
||
|Vincent Kerrio13,280 (43.42%)
|
|Peter Sobol7,952 (26.00%)
|
|
||
|Vince Kerrio
|-
| style="background:whitesmoke;"|Nickel Belt
|
|Marty McAllister3,923 (23.95%)
|
|Paul Adam3,046 (18.60%)
||
|Floyd Laughren9,410 (57.45%)
|
|
||
|Floyd Laughren
|-
| style="background:whitesmoke;"|Nipissing
|
|Merle Dickerson11,232 (37.56%)
||
|Mike Bolan12,898 (43.13%)
|
|Dennis Arsenault5,777 (19.32%)
|
|
||
|Richard Smith
|-
| style="background:whitesmoke;"|Northumberland
||
|Russell Rowe14,061 (48.30%)
|
|Dennis Buckley10,334 (35.50%)
|
|John Taylor4,716 (16.20%)
|
|
||
|Russell Rowe
|-
| style="background:whitesmoke;"|Oakville
||
|James Snow14,456 (50.97%)
|
|Walt Elliot7,948 (28.03%)
|
|Doug Black5,955 (21.00%)
|
|
||
|James Snow
|-
| style="background:whitesmoke;"|Oakwood
|
|Fergy Brown6,379 (30.10%)
|
|Richard Meagher5,046 (23.81%)
||
|Tony Grande9,214 (43.48%)
|
|Val Bjarnason (Comm)229 (1.08%)Willis Cummins170 (0.80%)Alex Eaglesham (Lbt)153 (0.72%)
||
|Tony Grande
|-
| style="background:whitesmoke;"|Oriole
||
|John Williams14,194 (44.32%)
|
|Luella Lumley9,707 (30.31%)
|
|Fred Birket6,737 (21.03%)
|
|Jim McMillan929 (2.90%)Paul Miniato (Lbt)282 (0.88%)Arthur Wright180 (0.56%)
||
|John Williams
|-
| style="background:whitesmoke;"|Oshawa
|
|Jack Snedden6,512 (28.35%)
|
|Ivan Wallace4,032 (17.55%)
||
|Mike Breaugh12,226 (53.23%)
|
|Russell Rak (Comm)199 (0.87%)
||
|Mike Breaugh
|-
| style="background:whitesmoke;"|Ottawa Centre
|
|Brian Cameron8,223 (32.16%)
|
|Ian Kimmerly6,358 (24.87%)
||
|Michael Cassidy10,626 (41.56%)
|
|Marvin Glass (Comm)360 (1.41%)
||
|Michael Cassidy
|-
| style="background:whitesmoke;"|Ottawa East
|
|Gisele Lalonde4,055 (17.24%)
||
|Albert Roy15,864 (67.44%)
|
|Robert Choquette3,605 (15.32%)
|
|
||
|Albert Roy
|-
| style="background:whitesmoke;"|Ottawa South
||
|Claude Bennett16,662 (49.37%)
|
|Patricia Thorpe7,754 (22.98%)
|
|Eileen Scotton8,759 (25.95%)
|
|Michael Houlton574 (1.70%)
||
|Claude Bennett
|-
| style="background:whitesmoke;"|Ottawa West
||
|Reuben Baetz15,279 (45.07%)
|
|Bill Roberts9,906 (29.22%)
|
|Marion Dewar8,718 (25.71%)
|
|
||
|Donald Morrow
|-
| style="background:whitesmoke;"|Oxford
||
|Harry Parrott17,758 (50.98%)
|
|John MacDonald12,657 (36.33%)
|
|Mike Casselman4,420 (12.69%)
|
|
||
|Harry Parrott
|-
| style="background:whitesmoke;"|Parkdale
|
|Lee Monaco4,116 (23.98%)
|
|Stan Mamak5,134 (29.91%)
||
|Jan Dukszta7,574 (44.12%)
|
|Gareth Blythe (Comm)343 (2.00%)
||
|Jan Dukszta
|-
| style="background:whitesmoke;"|Parry Sound
||
|Lorne Maeck9,929 (49.66%)
|
|Ed Fisher7,510 (37.57%)
|
|Ray Smith2,553 (12.77%)
|
|
||
|Lorne Maeck
|-
| style="background:whitesmoke;"|Perth
|
|Vivian Jarvis6,056 (22.92%)
||
|Hugh Edighoffer18,201 (68.88%)
|
|Carson McLauchlan2,167 (8.20%)
|
|
||
|Hugh Edighoffer
|-
| style="background:whitesmoke;"|Peterborough
||
|John Turner16,923 (40.66%)
|
|Peter Adams10,083 (24.23%)
|
|Gillian Sandeman14,275 (34.30%)
|
|John Hayes (Lbt)341 (0.82%)
||
|Gill Sandeman
|-
| style="background:whitesmoke;"|Port Arthur
|
|Allan Laakkonen9,290 (38.72%)
|
|Juha Siimes4,818 (20.08%)
||
|Jim Foulds9,629 (40.14%)
|
|Philip Harris (Comm)254 (1.06%)
||
|Jim Foulds
|-
| style="background:whitesmoke;"|Prescott and Russell
||
|Joseph Bélanger11,863 (48.74%)
|
|Philibert Proulx8,877 (36.48%)
|
|Joseph Cheff3,597 (14.78%)
|
|
||
|Joseph Bélanger
|-
| style="background:whitesmoke;"|Prince Edward-Lennox
||
|James Taylor11,411 (55.22%)
|
|Mary Kaiser5,759 (27.87%)
|
|Jan Nicol3,494 (16.91%)
|
|
||
|James Taylor
|-
| style="background:whitesmoke;"|Quinte
|
|Don Williams10,009 (36.70%)
||
|Hugh O'Neil17,264 (63.30%)
|
|
|
|
||
|Hugh O'Neil
|-
| style="background:whitesmoke;"|Rainy River
|
|Gordon Thomson3,268 (28.12%)
||
|T. Patrick Reid (Liberal-Labour)5,335 (45.90%)
|
|Howard Hampton3,019 (25.98%)
|
|
||
|T. Patrick Reid
|-
| style="background:whitesmoke;"|Renfrew North
|
|Bob Cotnam6,817 (32.70%)
||
|Sean Conway9,549 (45.80%)
|
|Bob Cox4,482 (21.50%)
|
|
||
|Sean Conway
|-
| style="background:whitesmoke;"|Renfrew South
||
|Paul Yakabuski12,666 (46.56%)
|
|Dick Trainor11,585 (42.59%)
|
|Harry Pattinson2,952 (10.85%)
|
|
||
|Paul Yakabuski
|-
| style="background:whitesmoke;"|Riverdale
|
|Nola Sam Crewe4,289 (24.83%)
|
|Dennis Drainville2,821 (16.33%)
||
|Jim Renwick9,639 (55.79%)
|
|Gordon Massie (Comm)214 (1.24%)Walter Balej (Lbt)196 (1.13%)Barry Weisleder (Ind/RMG)117 (0.68%)
||
|Jim Renwick
|-
| style="background:whitesmoke;"|St. Andrew-St. Patrick
||
|Larry Grossman11,621 (49.57%)
|
|Edward Clarke3,000 (12.80%)
|
|Barbara Beardsley8,452 (36.05%)
|
|Anna Larsen (Comm)198 (0.84%)Vincent Miller (Lbt)172 (0.73%)
||
|Larry Grossman
|-
| style="background:whitesmoke;"|St. Catharines
|
|Eleanor Lancaster11,669 (36.62%)
||
|Jim Bradley12,392 (38.89%)
|
|Fred Dickson7,556 (23.71%)
|
|Eric Blair (Comm)247 (0.78%)
||
|Robert Mercer Johnston
|-
| style="background:whitesmoke;"|St. David
||
|Margaret Scrivener11,894 (44.14%)
|
|Robert McClelland3,794 (14.08%)
|
|Gordon Cressy11,058 (41.03%)
|
|Shane Parkhill (Comm)202 (0.75%)
||
|Margaret Scrivener
|-
| style="background:whitesmoke;"|St. George
|
|Frank Vasilkioti9,807 (35.30%)
||
|Margaret Campbell10,289 (37.04%)
|
|Lukin Robinson6,171 (22.21%)
|
|D.M. Campbell1,083 (3.90%)David T. Anderson (Lbt)272 (0.98%)Fred Weir (Comm)159 (0.57%)
||
|Margaret Campbell
|-
| style="background:whitesmoke;"|Sarnia
|
|Andy Brandt11,243 (38.10%)
||
|Paul Blundy11,500 (38.97%)
|
|Wallace Krawczyk6,770 (22.94%)
|
|
||
|Jim Bullbrook
|-
| style="background:whitesmoke;"|Sault Ste. Marie
||
|John Rhodes19,209 (55.28%)
|
|John Nelson3,715 (10.69%)
|
|Don Burgess11,660 (33.56%)
|
|Arlene Bovingdon (Comm)162 (0.47%)
||
|John Rhodes
|-
| style="background:whitesmoke;"|Scarborough Centre
||
|Frank Drea11,585 (43.59%)
|
|Charles Beer5,263 (19.80%)
|
|Dave Gracey8,806 (33.14%)
|
|Robert Schultz (Lbt)722 (2.72%)Peter Sideris (Comm)200 (0.75%)
||
|Frank Drea
|-
| style="background:whitesmoke;"|Scarborough East
||
|Margaret Birch14,792 (50.91%)
|
|Ron Myatt6,558 (22.57%)
|
|Ann Marie Hill7,218 (24.84%)
|
|John White (Lbt)489 (1.68%)
||
|Margaret Birch
|-
| style="background:whitesmoke;"|Scarborough-Ellesmere
|
|Spurge Near9,676 (35.06%)
|
|Ken Dimson6,557 (23.76%)
||
|David Warner11,150 (40.40%)
|
|Mathias Blecker (Comm)213 (0.77%)
||
|David Warner
|-
| style="background:whitesmoke;"|Scarborough North
||
|Thomas Leonard Wells21,250 (50.02%)
|
|Jean Brookes10,495 (24.70%)
|
|Frank Lowery10,015 (23.57%)
|
|Marilee Haylock (Lbt)722 (1.70%)
||
|Thomas L Wells
|-
| style="background:whitesmoke;"|Scarborough West
|
|Kenneth Timney6,870 (27.79%)
|
|Bobby Orr3,869 (15.65%)
||
|Stephen Lewis13,340 (53.96%)
|
|Paul Mollon (Lbt)476 (1.93%)Richard Sanders (Ind)167 (0.68%)
||
|Stephen Lewis
|-
| style="background:whitesmoke;"|Simcoe Centre
||
|George Taylor15,876 (44.25%)
|
|Jim Corneau9,556 (26.64%)
|
|Paul Wessenger10,442 (29.11%)
|
|
||
|George Taylor
|-
| style="background:whitesmoke;"|Simcoe East
||
|Gordon Smith13,793 (44.74%)
|
|Elinor Bingham6,783 (22.00%)
|
|Roger Pretty10,254 (33.26%)
|
|
||
|Gordon Smith
|-
| style="background:whitesmoke;"|Stormont-Dundas and Glengarry
||
|Osie Villeneuve10,533 (49.15%)
|
|Johnny Whitteker8,111 (37.85%)
|
|Joe O'Neill2,788 (13.01%)
|
|
||
|Osie Villeneuve
|-
| style="background:whitesmoke;"|Sudbury
|
|Peter Cosgrove8,485 (31.77%)
|
|Gaetan Doucet6,778 (25.38%)
||
|Bud Germa11,117 (41.62%)
|
|Justin Legault (Comm)330 (1.24%)
||
|Bud Germa
|-
| style="background:whitesmoke;"|Sudbury East
|
|Michael Hopkins7,001 (24.16%)
|
|Garrett Lacey5,984 (20.65%)
||
|Elie Martel15,991 (55.19%)
|
|
||
|Elie Martel
|-
| style="background:whitesmoke;"|Timiskaming
||
|Ed Havrot9,578 (47.95%)
|
|Dan Casey1,481 (7.42%)
|
|Robert Bain8,914 (44.63%)
|
|
||
|Robert Bain
|-
| style="background:whitesmoke;"|Victoria-Haliburton
|
|Jim Webster10,539 (33.34%)
||
|John Eakins15,218 (48.15%)
|
|Fred McLaughlin5,851 (18.51%)
|
|
||
|John Eakins
|-
| style="background:whitesmoke;"|Waterloo North
|
|Bob Gramlow8,016 (32.88%)
||
|Herb Epp13,556 (55.60%)
|
|Mary-Jane Mewhinney2,809 (11.52%)
|
|
||
|Edward R. Good
|-
| style="background:whitesmoke;"|Welland-Thorold
|
|Allan Pietz10,389 (37.88%)
|
|Keith Cameron4,335 (15.81%)
||
|Mel Swart12,704 (46.32%)
|
|
||
|Mel Swart
|-
| style="background:whitesmoke;"|Wellington-Dufferin-Peel
||
|Jack Johnson14,272 (45.83%)
|
|David Wright9,631 (30.93%)
|
|Marion Chambers7,235 (23.24%)
|
|
||
|Jack Johnson
|-
| style="background:whitesmoke;"|Wellington South
|
|Doug Auld7,667 (23.89%)
||
|Harry Worton16,212 (50.52%)
|
|Carl Hamilton7,886 (24.57%)
|
|Brian Seymour (Lbt)163 (0.51%)Eric Blythe (Comm)162 (0.50%)
||
|Harry Worton
|-
| style="background:whitesmoke;"|Wentworth
|
|Dave Brown5,506 (21.48%)
|
|Dennis Wilson4,800 (18.72%)
||
|Ian Deans15,332 (59.80%)
|
|
||
|Ian Deans
|-
| style="background:whitesmoke;"|Wentworth North
|
|John Voortman8,464 (24.94%)
||
|Eric Cunningham18,322 (53.98%)
|
|Dennis Young7,157 (21.09%)
|
|
||
|Eric Cunningham
|-
| style="background:whitesmoke;"|Wilson Heights
||
|David Rotenberg11,430 (41.97%)
|
|Murray Markin7,195 (26.42%)
|
|Howard Moscoe8,437 (30.98%)
|
|Webster J Webb (Lbt)174 (0.64%)
||
|David Rotenberg
|-
| style="background:whitesmoke;"|Windsor-Riverside
|
|Al Santing4,878 (17.18%)
|
|Michael MacDougall10,572 (37.23%)
||
|Dave Cooke12,947 (45.59%)
|
|
||
|Dave Cooke
|-
| style="background:whitesmoke;"|Windsor-Sandwich
|
|Randy Atkins2,838 (15.01%)
|
|Carman McClelland6,024 (31.86%)
||
|Ted Bounsall9,711 (51.36%)
|
|Mike Longmoore (Comm)334 (1.77%)
||
|Ted Bounsall
|-
| style="background:whitesmoke;"|Windsor-Walkerville
|
|Ron Moro4,842 (22.88%)
||
|Bernard Newman11,233 (53.09%)
|
|Len Wallace4,565 (21.57%)
|
|Allan MacDonald (Dem)233 (1.10%)Nicola Veronico (Comm)124 (0.59%)Joe Crouchman103 (0.49%)Diane Donison59 (0.28%)
||
|Bernard Newman
|-
| style="background:whitesmoke;"|York Centre
|
|Bill Corcoran15,768 (39.76%)
||
|Alfred Stong17,608 (44.41%)
|
|Chris Olsen6,277 (15.83%)
|
|
||
|Alfred Stong
|-
| style="background:whitesmoke;"|York East
||
|Robert Elgie14,131 (46.72%)
|
|Mike Kenny7,126 (23.56%)
|
|Lois Cox8,334 (27.55%)
|
|Chris Greenland (Ind SC)265 (0.88%)Maura O'Neill (Comm)245 (0.81%)Paul Wakfer (Lbt)144 (0.48%)
||
|Robert Elgie
|-
| style="background:whitesmoke;"|York Mills
||
|Bette Stephenson21,656 (58.32%)
|
|Wilfred Caplan9,614 (25.89%)
|
|Allan Millard5,071 (13.66%)
|
|Donald Gordon465 (1.25%)Scott Bell (Lbt)368 (0.99%)
||
|Bette Stephenson
|-
| style="background:whitesmoke;"|York North
||
|Bill Hodgson15,639 (48.05%)
|
|Jim Wilson9,660 (29.68%)
|
|Ian Scott7,247 (22.27%)
|
|
||
|Bill Hodgson
|-
| style="background:whitesmoke;"|York South
|
|Austin Clarke7,666 (27.34%)
|
|Michael Kolle5,332 (19.02%)
||
|Donald C. MacDonald14,178 (50.56%)
|
|Mike Phillips (Comm)526 (1.88%)Ken Kortentayer (Lbt)338 (1.21%)
||
|Donald C. MacDonald
|-
| style="background:whitesmoke;"|York West
||
|Nick Leluk16,538 (46.25%)
|
|Pete Farrow10,450 (29.22%)
|
|Ian Barrett8,510 (23.80%)
|
|Ronald Vaughan (LbT)260 (0.73%)
||
|Nick Leluk
|-
| style="background:whitesmoke;"|Yorkview
|
|George Gemmell4,105 (15.50%)
|
|Paul Uguccioni6,503 (24.55%)
||
|Fred Young14,426 (54.46%)
|
|Dorlene Hewitt488 (1.84%)Hersh Gelman (Lbt)487 (1.84%)Roberto Moretton (Comm)359 (1.36%)Helen Obadia (Ind NALP)120 (0.45%)
||
|Fred Young
|-

|}

See also
Politics of Ontario
List of Ontario political parties
Premier of Ontario
Leader of the Opposition (Ontario)
Independent candidates, 1977 Ontario provincial election

References

Further reading 
 

1977 elections in Canada
1977
1977 in Ontario
June 1977 events in Canada